Moskowitz (also Moskovitz, Moskovits, Moscovitch, Moskovich, Moszkowicz, and other variants) is an Eastern Ashkenazic Jewish surname.  A Germanized form of a Slavic patronymic of the Yiddish personal name Moshke, a pet form of Moshe. Moscovici is the Romanian form.

People

Moschcowitz 
 Eli Moschcowitz (1879–1964), Hungarian-born American doctor

Moscovich 
 Ivan Moscovich (born 1926), a designer of games, puzzles, toys, and educational aids
 Maurice Moscovich (1871–1940), Russian-American actor

Moscovitch 
 Dylan Moscovitch (born 1984), Canadian Olympic medalist pair skater
 Hannah Moscovitch (born 1978), a Canadian female playwright
 Morris Moscovitch, the Max & Gianna Glassman Chair in Neuropsychology and Aging and Professor of Psychology at the University of Toronto

Moshkovich 
 Zelman Moshkovich Chernyavsky (1903–1968), a Jewish Soviet cinematographer

Moshkovitz 
 Omer Moshkovitz, actor
 Shulem Moshkovitz (died 1958), Romania-born rabbi, known as the Shotzer Rebbe

Moshkowitz 
 Dana Moshkovitz, Israeli computer scientist

Moskovitz 
 Dustin Moskovitz, American businessman
Rabbi Dan Moskovitz

Moskowitz 

 Abraham Moskowitz Yiddish-language singer
 Avigdor Moskowitz (born 1953), Israeli basketball player
 Barry Ted Moskowitz (born 1950, Paterson, New Jersey), United States federal judge
 Belle Moskowitz, political advisor to New York Governor and 1928 presidential candidate Alfred E. Smith
 Bezalel Joshua Moskowitz
 Dara Moskowitz Grumdahl, née Moskowitz, a food and wine writer, based in Minneapolis, Minnesota
 Ehud Moskowitz (Moshkovitsh)
 Eli "Hawk" Moskowitz, character in TV series Cobra Kai
 Eva Moskowitz, educator and former City Council member in New York City
 Eve Merriam, née Moskovitz (born 1916, Philadelphia), an American poet
 Gilberte Marin-Moskovitz (1937–2019), French politician
 Gordon Moskowitz, social psychologist
 Hannah Moskowitz (born 1991), American author
 Henry Moskowitz, civil rights leader  
 Henry Moskowitz, New York real estate investor
 Howard Moskowitz, American market researcher and psychophysicist
 Irving Moskowitz, Jewish American businessman and philanthropist
 Isa Chandra Moskowitz, American-born cookbook author
 Jared E. Moskowitz (born 1980), youngest elected official in South Florida
 Joel Moskowitz, American public health researcher
 Joseph Moskowitz, Romanian-born American cimbalom player and Restaurateur
 Miriam Moskowitz. American convicted of conspiracy to obstruct justice during the McCarthy era
 Naftali Asher Yeshayahu Moscowitz (Moskowitz), a Melitzer Rebbe of Ashdod
 Ohad Moskowitz (born 1974), Orthodox Jewish singer
 Paul Moskowitz, Research Staff Member at the IBM Thomas J. Watson Research Center in Hawthorne, NY
 Robert Moskowitz, American painter
 Sam Moskowitz, writer, critic, and historian
 Sid Moscowitz, character in the 1990 film Alice
 Stacy Moskowitz, shooting victim of David Berkowitz
 Stanley Moskowitz, top official of the Central Intelligence Agency
 Tobias Jacob "Toby" Moskowitz (born 1971), an American financial economist and professor

Moszkowicz 
 Bram Moszkowicz (born 1960), a Dutch jurist and former lawyer, son of Max Moszkowicz sr.
 Daniel Moszkowicz, aka Dawid Chone (1905, Warsaw - 1943, Białystok), Jewish Polish merchant
 Imo Moszkowicz (1925, Ahlen - 2011, Munich), German director, writer and actor
 Ludwig Moszkowicz (1873, Kraków - 1945, Vienna), Jewish Polish/Austro-Hungarian surgeon, pathologist
 Martin Moszkowicz (born 1958), German film producer
 Max Moszkowicz sr. (born 1926), a retired Dutch lawyer
 Michał Moszkowicz (born 1941, Magnitogorsk), Jewish Polish writer
 "Baruch" Robert Moszkowicz (born 1953, Maastricht), son of Max Moszkowicz sr.

In Fiction 
 An American Tail: Fievel Goes West, an animated comedy film where the protagonist is a mouse named Fievel Mousekewitz (word play on Moskowitz)
 "Merry Christmas, Mrs. Moskowitz", the tenth episode in season 6 of American sitcom Frasier
 Minnie and Moskowitz, a film by John Cassavetes
 Princess Diaries series of books by Meg Cabot where Moscovitz siblings, Michael and Lilly, are the oldest friends of protagonist Mia Thermopolis and important characters of the story.

Other 
 Wilson Elser Moskowitz Edelman & Dicker, a New York City law firm founded in 1979
 Moschkowitz Syndrome (Thrombotic thrombocytopenic purpura), named after discoverer Eli Moschkowitz

See also 
 Moskvitch (disambiguation)
 Moscovici (Romanian form)

References

Jewish surnames
Polish-language surnames
Slavic-language surnames
Patronymic surnames
Yiddish-language surnames